Hayes Township is a township in Dickinson County, Kansas, USA.  As of the 2000 census, its population was 233.

Hayes Township was organized in 1877.

Geography

Further reading

References
 USGS Geographic Names Information System (GNIS)

External links

 City-Data.com

Townships in Dickinson County, Kansas
Townships in Kansas